The first county elections were held in Finland on 23 January 2022. Voters elected the council members of the 21 new wellbeing services counties. Residents of Helsinki were excluded from voting, as the city continues to be responsible for organizing health, social and rescue services in Helsinki. Åland was also excluded, as it is not affected by the health and social services reform.

Electoral system 
A total of 1379 members of the 21 councils (each council consisting of 59 to 79 members) were elected using proportional representation, with seats allocated according to the d'Hondt method.

Opinion polls
Poll results are listed in the table below in reverse chronological order, showing the most recent first. The highest percentage figure in each poll is displayed in bold, and the background shaded in the leading party's colour. In the instance that there is a tie, then no figure is shaded. The table uses the date the survey's fieldwork was done, as opposed to the date of publication. However, if that date is unknown, the date of publication will be given instead. List includes only polls that were made for the municipal election.

Results

References

January 2022 events in Finland
Municipal elections in Finland
Finland